The Music Bank Chart is a record chart established in 1998 on the South Korean KBS television music program Music Bank. Every week during its live broadcast, the show gives an award for the best-performing single on the South Korean chart. The chart includes digital performance on domestic online music services (65%), album sales (5%), number of times the single was broadcast on KBS TV (20%), and viewers' choice (10%) in its ranking methodology. The score for domestic online music services is calculated using data from Melon, Bugs, Genie Music and Soribada. Laboum member Ahn Sol-bin and actor Lee Seo-won hosted the show in 2017. Ahn Sol-bin began hosting the show in July 2016 while Lee Seo-won began hosting in November 2016.

In 2017, 35 singles reached number one on the chart, and 26 acts were awarded first-place trophies. Of all releases for the year BTS's "Spring Day" acquired the highest point total with a score of 13,250 after the single debuted at number one on the February 24 broadcast. Their single "DNA" spent three consecutive weeks at number one on the chart. "Plz Don't Be Sad" earned boy group Highlight (formerly Beast) their first Music Bank award since leaving Cube Entertainment and re-debuting with Around Us Entertainment. The single went on to spend three consecutive weeks at number one on the chart. Girl group Twice had five number one singles on the chart in 2017 achieved with "TT", "Knock Knock", "Signal", "Likey" and "Heart Shaker", the most of any act in 2017. The five songs spent a total of nine weeks atop the chart, making Twice the act with the most wins of the year.

Nine acts gained their first number ones on the chart in 2017. Miss A member Suzy achieved her first solo music show award with her debut single "Pretend" in January. In April, girl group Laboum achieved their first music show award with "Hwi Hwi" from their second mini album. Two weeks later, Sechs Kies made their debut at number one with "Be Well". Hwang Chi-yeul achieved his first music show award with "A Daily Song" on the June 23 broadcast over 10 years after his debut. Boy group Wanna One achieved their first number one on Music Bank with their debut single "Energetic" which was immediately followed into the top spot by another first time chart-topper, Yoon Jong-shin with his song "Like It". Yoon achieved his first number one over 27 years after his debut. Boy group NU'EST's sub unit NU'EST W achieved their first number one with their debut single "Where You At". The final artist to reach number one for the first time in 2017 was the hip hop trio Epik High who topped the chart for the first time in November with "Love Story".

Chart history

Notes

References 

2017 in South Korean music
2017 record charts
Lists of number-one songs in South Korea